The 2006 French Grand Prix (officially the Formula 1 Grand Prix de France 2006) was a Formula One motor race held at the Circuit de Nevers Magny-Cours, near Magny-Cours, France on 16 July 2006. The 70-lap race was the eleventh round of the 2006 Formula One season, the 57th French Grand Prix as part of the World Championship, and the 92nd overall. This race also marked the centenary of the first French Grand Prix in 1906.

This race was a scene of yet another record breaking milestone for Michael Schumacher, who became the first driver in F1 history to win the same Grand Prix on eight occasions (having previously won the French Grand Prix in 1994, 1995, 1997, 1998, 2001, 2002 and 2004). Schumacher also achieved his 22nd career hat trick (pole position, win & fastest lap at the same race), also a record. Fernando Alonso, driving a Renault at the team's home race, finished second, whilst Schumacher's Ferrari team-mate, Felipe Massa, completed the podium by finishing in third position.

This was the first time that neither Honda was classified. It was also the 68th and final pole position of Michael Schumacher's career. Schumacher held the record for the most pole positions until Lewis Hamilton surpassed it at the 2017 Italian Grand Prix.

Report

Practice and qualifying

Friday drivers
The bottom 6 teams in the 2005 Constructors' Championship and Super Aguri were entitled to run a third car in free practice on Friday. These drivers drove on Friday but did not compete in qualifying or the race.

Classification

Qualifying

Race

Championship standings after the race

Drivers' Championship standings

Constructors' Championship standings

 Note: Only the top five positions are included for both sets of standings.

See also 
 2006 Magny-Cours GP2 Series round

References

External links

 Detailed French Grand Prix results

French Grand Prix
French Grand Prix
Grand Prix
French Grand Prix